Hunt Downing House, also known as Arrandale, is a historic home located in West Whiteland Township, Chester County, Pennsylvania. It consists of a -story, five-bay central block built about 1810, a kitchen wing, and a one bay library addition built in 1946.  The house is in the late Federal style.  The main entrance features a semi-circular fanlight and column supported entablature.  Also on the property is a contributing stone Great Barn.

It was listed on the National Register of Historic Places in 1990. A boundary decrease took place the same year.

References

Houses on the National Register of Historic Places in Pennsylvania
Federal architecture in Pennsylvania
Houses completed in 1810
Houses in Chester County, Pennsylvania
National Register of Historic Places in Chester County, Pennsylvania